Sammy Slot (born 26 February 1997 in Denmark) is a Danish footballer.

Career

In 2018, he signed for Port F.C.

References

Danish men's footballers
Living people
Association football forwards
1997 births
Sammy Slot